Dodurga is a town (belde) in the Orta District, Çankırı Province, Turkey. Its population is 1,871 (2021).

References

Populated places in Orta District